Ablin is a surname. Notable people with the surname include: 

Richard J. Ablin (born 1940), American scientist
Setkul Ablin (fl.  1653–1672) Russian trader and agent